Dovezance is a village in the municipality of Kumanovo, North Macedonia. It used to be part of the former municipality of Klečevce.

Demographics
According to the 2002 census, the village had a total of 123 inhabitants. Ethnic groups in the village include:

Macedonians 123

References

Villages in Kumanovo Municipality